Tetrastigma is a genus of plants in the grape family, Vitaceae.  The plants are lianas that climb with tendrils and have palmately compound leaves.  Plants are dioecious, with separate male and female plants; female flowers are characterized by their four-lobed stigmas. The species are found in subtropical and tropical regions of Asia, Malaysia, and Australia, where they grow in primary rainforest, gallery forest and monsoon forest and moister woodland.  Species of this genus are notable as being the sole hosts of parasitic plants in the family Rafflesiaceae, one of which, Rafflesia arnoldii, produces the largest single flower in the world. Tetrastigma is the donor species for horizontal gene transfer to Sapria and Rafflesia due to multiple gene theft events.

Within the Vitaceae, Tetrastigma has long been considered closely related to Cayratia and Cyphostemma and is now placed in the tribe Cayratieae.

Fossil record
A fossil seed fragment from the early Miocene of Tetrastigma sp., has been found in the Czech part of the Zittau Basin. Tetrastigma macrofossils have been recovered from the late Zanclean stage of Pliocene sites in Pocapaglia,  Italy.

Etymology
Tetrastigma is derived from Greek and means 'four stigmas', in reference to its four-lobed stigma.

Species
Plants of the World Online currently includes:

 Tetrastigma amboinense (Miq.) Planch.
 Tetrastigma andamanicum (King) Suess.
 Tetrastigma angustifolium (Roxb.) Planch.
 Tetrastigma annamense Gagnep.
 Tetrastigma apiculatum Gagnep.
 Tetrastigma aplinianum (Collett & Hemsl.) Momiy.
 Tetrastigma articulatum (Miq.) Planch.
 Tetrastigma assimile (Kurz) C.L.Li ex Kochaiph. & Trias-Blasi
 Tetrastigma backanense Gagnep.
 Tetrastigma bambusetorum Craib
 Tetrastigma beauvaisii Gagnep.
 Tetrastigma bracteolatum (Wall.) Planch.
 Tetrastigma brunneum Merr.
 Tetrastigma burmanicum (Collett & Hemsl.) Momiy.
 Tetrastigma calcicola Kochaiph. & Trias-Blasi
 Tetrastigma cambodianum Pierre ex Gagnep.
 Tetrastigma campylocarpum (Kurz) Planch.
 Tetrastigma caudatum Merr. & Chun
 Tetrastigma cauliflorum Merr.
 Tetrastigma ceratopetalum C.Y.Wu
 Tetrastigma chapaense Merr.
 Tetrastigma clementis Merr.
 Tetrastigma coriaceum (DC.) Gagnep.
 Tetrastigma corniculatum Merr.
 Tetrastigma crenatum Jackes
 Tetrastigma cruciatum Craib & Gagnep.
 Tetrastigma curtisii (Ridl.) Suess.
 Tetrastigma delavayi Gagnep.
 Tetrastigma dichotomum (Miq.) Planch.
 Tetrastigma diepenhorstii (Miq.) Latiff
 Tetrastigma dubium (M.A.Lawson) Planch.
 Tetrastigma eberhardtii Gagnep.
 Tetrastigma ellipticum Merr.
 Tetrastigma enervium Ridl.
 Tetrastigma erubescens Planch.
 Tetrastigma everettii Merr.
 Tetrastigma formosanum (Hemsl.) Gagnep.
 Tetrastigma funingense C.L.Li
 Tetrastigma gamblei B.V.Shetty & P.Singh
 Tetrastigma gaudichaudianum Planch.
 Tetrastigma gibbosum Lauterb.
 Tetrastigma gilgianum Lauterb.
 Tetrastigma harmandii Planch. – Ayo, ariuat, kalit, iyo
 Tetrastigma havilandii Ridl.
 Tetrastigma hemsleyanum Diels & Gilg
 Tetrastigma heterophyllum Gagnep.
 Tetrastigma hookeri Planch.
 Tetrastigma hypoglaucum Planch.
 Tetrastigma jaichagunii C.L.Li ex Kochaiph. & Trias-Blasi
 Tetrastigma jingdongense C.L.Li
 Tetrastigma jinghongense C.L.Li
 Tetrastigma jinxiuense C.L.Li
 Tetrastigma kwangsiense C.L.Li
 Tetrastigma laevigatum (Blume) Gagnep.
 Tetrastigma lanyuense C.E.Chang
 Tetrastigma latiffii Veldkamp
 Tetrastigma lauterbachianum Gilg
 Tetrastigma laxum Merr.
 Tetrastigma lenticellatum C.Y.Wu
 Tetrastigma leucostaphylum (Dennst.) Alston
 Tetrastigma lincangense C.L.Li
 Tetrastigma lineare W.T.Wang ex C.Y.Wu & C.L.Li
 Tetrastigma littorale Merr.
 Tetrastigma liukiuense T.Yamaz.
 Tetrastigma loheri Gagnep.
 Tetrastigma longipedunculatum C.L.Li
 Tetrastigma longisepalum Gagnep.
 Tetrastigma macrocorymbum Gagnep. ex J.Wen, Boggan & Turland
 Tetrastigma magnum Merr.
 Tetrastigma megacarpum Latiff
 Tetrastigma mindanaense Merr.
 Tetrastigma mutabile (Blume) Planch.
 Tetrastigma nilagiricum (Miq.) B.V.Shetty
 Tetrastigma nitens (F.Muell.) Planch.
 Tetrastigma obovatum Gagnep.
 Tetrastigma obtectum (Wall. ex M.A.Lawson) Planch. ex Franch.
 Tetrastigma oliviforme Planch.
 Tetrastigma pachyphyllum (Hemsl.) Chun
 Tetrastigma papillatum (Hance) C.Y.Wu
 Tetrastigma papillosum (Blume) Planch.
 Tetrastigma papuanum (Miq.) Planch.
 Tetrastigma pedunculare (Wall. ex M.A.Lawson) Planch.
 Tetrastigma pergamaceum (Blume) Planch.
 Tetrastigma petraeum Jackes
 Tetrastigma petrophilum Lauterb.
 Tetrastigma pilosum C.L.Li
 Tetrastigma planicaule (Hook.f.) Gagnep.
 Tetrastigma poilanei Gagnep.
 Tetrastigma pseudocruciatum C.L.Li
 Tetrastigma pubiflorum (Miq.) Suess.
 Tetrastigma pubinerve Merr. & Chun
 Tetrastigma pullei Lauterb.
 Tetrastigma pycnanthum (Collett & Hemsl.) P.Singh & B.V.Shetty
 Tetrastigma pyriforme Gagnep.
 Tetrastigma quadrangulum Gagnep. & Craib
 Tetrastigma quadridens Planch.
 Tetrastigma rafflesiae (Miq.) Planch.
 Tetrastigma ramentaceum Planch.
 Tetrastigma retinervium Planch.
 Tetrastigma robinsonii Merr.
 Tetrastigma robustum Planch.
 Tetrastigma rumicispermum (M.A.Lawson) Planch.
 Tetrastigma rupestre Planch.
 Tetrastigma scariosum (Blume) Planch.
 Tetrastigma schlechteri Lauterb.
 Tetrastigma schraderi-montis Lauterb.
 Tetrastigma scortechinii (King) Gagnep.
 Tetrastigma sepulchrei Merr.
 Tetrastigma serrulatum (Roxb.) Planch.
 Tetrastigma sessilifolium Lauterb.
 Tetrastigma siamense Gagnep. & Craib
 Tetrastigma sichouense C.L.Li
 Tetrastigma silvestrei Elmer ex J.Wen & Boggan
 Tetrastigma simplicifolia (Merr.) J.Wen & Boggan
 Tetrastigma steenisii Latiff
 Tetrastigma subsuberosum Planch.
 Tetrastigma subtetragonum C.L.Li
 Tetrastigma sulcatum (M.A.Lawson) Gamble
 Tetrastigma taeniatum C.L.Li
 Tetrastigma tamilnadense N.Balach. & K.Ravik.
 Tetrastigma tavoyanum Gagnep.
 Tetrastigma tetragynum (Miq.) Planch.
 Tetrastigma thomsonianum Planch.
 Tetrastigma thorsborneorum Jackes
 Tetrastigma tonkinense Gagnep.
 Tetrastigma touranense Gagnep.
 Tetrastigma trifoliolatum Merr.
 Tetrastigma triphyllum (Gagnep.) W.T.Wang
 Tetrastigma tsaianum C.Y.Wu
 Tetrastigma venulosum C.Y.Wu
 Tetrastigma vitiense (A.Gray) A.C.Sm.
 Tetrastigma voinierianum (Sallier) Pierre ex Gagnep.
 Tetrastigma warburgii Lauterb.
 Tetrastigma xishuangbannaense C.L.Li
 Tetrastigma xizangense C.L.Li
 Tetrastigma yiwuense C.L.Li
 Tetrastigma yunnanense Gagnep.

References

Vitaceae
Vitaceae genera
Dioecious plants